The Skai TV bombing was a terrorist attack against the headquarters of Skai TV that took place on 17 December 2018 in Neo Phalero, Greece.

References

Explosions in 2018
Terrorist incidents in Europe in 2018
Terrorist incidents in Greece
2018 in Greece
December 2018 events in Europe
December 2018 crimes in Europe
2018 crimes in Greece
Terrorist incidents in Greece in the 2010s